Kristy Lee Sargeant-Wirtz (born January 24, 1974) is a Canadian former pair skater. With Kris Wirtz, she is the 1999 Four Continents silver medallist, the 1994 Skate Canada International champion, and a two-time Canadian national champion. The pair competed at two Winter Olympics.

Career 
Sargeant competed with Colin Epp early in her career. In 1992, she teamed up with Kris Wirtz.

Sargeant/Wirtz made their debut at the 1993 Canadian Championships and finished fifth. The following season, they won the national silver medal and were assigned to the 1994 Winter Olympics in Lillehammer, where they placed tenth. They then finished 11th at the 1994 World Championships.

In the 1994–95 season, Sergeant/Wirtz won gold at the 1994 Skate Canada International, having placed seventh a year earlier, but dipped to fifth at the Canadian Championships. The next season, they reached the national podium again and finished seventh at their second Worlds. The pair would appear at a total of seven World Championships during their career, placing as high as sixth (1997, 1999).

In 1998, Sargeant/Wirtz won their first national title and were sent to the 1998 Winter Olympics in Nagano. They placed 12th in their second Olympic appearance. The pair became national champions for the second time in 1999.

Sargeant/Wirtz retired from competition in around 2003. They work as coaches at the Kitchener-Waterloo Skating Club , based in Waterloo, Ontario, Canada.

Personal life 
Sargeant gave birth to her and Jason Turner's daughter, Triston, in 1992. She married Kris Wirtz in 1999 and their daughter, Briana, was born in May 2002. Sargeant-Wirtz is the sister of Lisa Sargeant, the 1990 Canadian ladies champion.

Results
(with Kris Wirtz)

Navigation

1974 births
Canadian female pair skaters
Olympic figure skaters of Canada
Figure skaters at the 1994 Winter Olympics
Figure skaters at the 1998 Winter Olympics
Living people
Four Continents Figure Skating Championships medalists
Sportspeople from Red Deer, Alberta